is a multi-purpose stadium in Marugame, Kagawa, Japan, formally called Kagawa Marugame Stadium. It is currently used mostly for football matches.  The stadium holds 30,099 people.  The stadium was built in 1997.

It was formerly known as Kagawa Marugame Stadium. Since September 2015 it has been called Pikara Stadium for the naming rights.

Gallery

References

External links
  

Football venues in Japan
Athletics (track and field) venues in Japan
Multi-purpose stadiums in Japan
Sports venues in Kagawa Prefecture
Kamatamare Sanuki
Marugame, Kagawa
1997 establishments in Japan
Sports venues completed in 1997